The 1942 North Carolina Tar Heels football team represented the University of North Carolina at Chapel Hill during the 1942 college football season. The Tar Heels were led by first-year head coach Jim Tatum and played their home games at Kenan Memorial Stadium. They competed as a member of the Southern Conference. Tatum left the school to join the Navy at the end of the season. He returned to coach the Tar Heels from 1956 to 1958.

Schedule

References

North Carolina
North Carolina Tar Heels football seasons
North Carolina Tar Heels football